Sandra Thomas is an Indian film producer and actress. She is best known for her roles in Amen and Zachariayude Garbhinikal, also as the producer of Zachariayude Garbhinikal and Philips and the Monkey Pen. Sandra, along with producer Vijay Babu founded the film-production company Friday Film House, but she got in conflict with Vijay Babu and withdrew from Friday Film House.

Personal life 
She married Wilson John Thomas in July 2016, the couples blessed with twin daughters in 2018.

Friday Film House 
The film Friday was the crux of Sandra's career and also turned to be for Friday Film House, owned along with actor Vijay Babu. Though the company is established after the release of Friday, the movie is considered as the first production venture of Friday Film House. On 3 January 2017, the founders had a quarrel with each other in their office after which Sandra filed a case against Vijay Babu. Later both declared that it was a misunderstanding and that Sandra had taken a break from the industry. She started her own production company named Sandra Thomas Productions.

Filmography 

2016 : Theatrical Rights/Distribution - Theri

Television career
List of television appearances

Awards
 Kerala State Film Awards
 2014 – Special Jury Award for Philips and the Monkey Pen 
 2013 – Kerala State Film Award for Best Children's Film

References

External links 
 Official Website of Sandra Thomas Productions
 

Actresses from Kottayam
Actresses in Malayalam cinema
Indian film actresses
Living people
Malayalam film producers
Film producers from Kochi
Actresses from Kochi
Indian women film producers
Child actresses in Malayalam cinema
20th-century Indian actresses
21st-century Indian actresses
Businesswomen from Kerala
Year of birth missing (living people)